Blaise Bigirimana (born 4 November 1998) is a Burundian football striker who plays for Namungo.

References

1998 births
Living people
Burundian footballers
Burundi international footballers
S.C. Kiyovu Sports players
Alliance Academy F.C. players
Namungo F.C. players
Association football forwards
Burundian expatriate footballers
Expatriate footballers in Rwanda
Burundian expatriate sportspeople in Rwanda
Expatriate footballers in Tanzania
Burundian expatriate sportspeople in Tanzania
Tanzanian Premier League players